This is a list of Murray State Racers football players in the NFL Draft.

Key

Selections

References

Murray State

Murray State Racers NFL Draft